Jennifer Margot Minto (born 1968) is a Scottish National Party (SNP) politician who has been the Member of the Scottish Parliament (MSP) for Argyll and Bute since 2021.

Career 
Minto was educated at Madras College in St. Andrews, and graduated with an MA in accountancy from the University of Aberdeen in 1989. She qualified as a chartered accountant in 1992.

Prior to being elected as an MSP, she worked at accountancy firm KPMG, and as a business executive at BBC Scotland in Glasgow. She later settled on the Isle of Islay, with management roles at the Islay Energy Trust and the Museum of Islay Life.

Minto was elected as her party's candidate for the election by local SNP members in November 2020, and entered parliament on 8 May 2021.

From 17 June 2021 - 1 Feb 2023, she sat on the Rural Affairs Islands and Natural Environment Committee.

As of 2022, she sits on the Constitution, Europe, External Affairs and Culture Committee, the Delegated Powers and Law Reform Committee, and the Rural Affairs and Islands Committee, as well as 15 cross-party groups including the Cross-Party Group in the Scottish Parliament on Creative Economy and Cross-Party Group in the Scottish Parliament on Tourism.

Caledonian MacBryne ferry delay 
In the late 2010s, Scottish islanders began to complain that the ageing ferry fleet that connected them to the mainland had become increasingly unreliable. During the winter of 2022 only one in three sailings to the island of Coll went ahead; Hebridean shopkeepers kept receiving deliveries of rotten food;
while other islanders said they had missed doctors’ appointments, funerals and even the chance to say goodbye to dying loved ones because of cancelled sailings.

In June 2022, Minto raised the issue in the Scottish Parliament; "I was impacted by a ferry breakdown on Monday, but thanks to the excellent CalMac staff, I and other ferry users were able to get on later ferries. Does the First Minister agree that the staff of CalMac work tirelessly to help all their customers when breakdowns happen?" Nicola Sturgeon agreed and said, "The CalMac staff do an excellent job, often in really difficult circumstances, so I want to recognise and acknowledge that".

References

External links 
 

1968 births
Date of birth missing (living people)
Living people
Scottish National Party MSPs
Members of the Scottish Parliament 2021–2026
Female members of the Scottish Parliament
People associated with Argyll and Bute
Alumni of the University of Aberdeen